Henriette Dauer-von Etzdorf (1758 – 16 March 1843 in Vienna) was a German stage actress and opera singer.

Born in Gotha, Dauer, née von Etzdorf, made her stage debut in 1778. She worked at the Hofburgtheater from 1779 to 1822, mostly as an actress, but also as an opera singer according to the customs of that time. She often played at the Burgtheater. Towards the end of her career she played comic mothers and comic old men. 
She was married to her colleague Johann Ernst Dauer (1746-1812).

References

Further reading 
 Wilhelm Kosch (editor): Deutsches Theater-Lexikon. Volume I. A - Hurka. page 300. Walter de Gruyter, Berlin, 1953,  (read online).
 Kutsch/Riemens: Großes Sängerlexikon. original edition, K. G. Saur, Bern, 1993, first volume A–L,  (3 volumes)

1758 births
1843 deaths
Actors from Thuringia
German stage actresses
18th-century German women opera singers
19th-century German women opera singers
19th-century German actresses
18th-century German actresses
Musicians from Thuringia
People from Gotha (town)